Williamson Rock is a rock lying 4 nautical miles (7 km) northwest of Cape Crozier, close off the north coast of Ross Island. Charted by the British Antarctic Expedition, 1910–13, under Scott. Named for Thomas S. Williamson, who as able seaman and petty officer accompanied Scott's expeditions of 1901-04 and 1910–13.

Rock formations of the Ross Dependency
Landforms of Ross Island